Zwierzynek may refer to the following places:
Zwierzynek, Pomeranian Voivodeship (north Poland)
Zwierzynek, Choszczno County in West Pomeranian Voivodeship (north-west Poland)
Zwierzynek, West Pomeranian Voivodeship (north-west Poland)